During 1971-72 season Juventus competed in Serie A, Coppa Italia and UEFA Cup.

Summary 
Juventus won the domestic league after 5 years, being its 14th league in their history this time with Cestmir Vycpalek as manager.

Squad 
Source:

Competitions

Serie A

League table

Matches

Coppa Italia

First round

Second round

UEFA Cup

First round

Round  of 32

Eightfinals

Quarterfinals

Statistics

Goalscorers 
Source:
 

18 goals
 Pietro Anastasi

15 goals
 Roberto Bettega

13 goals
 Fabio Capello

10 goals
 Franco Causio
 Helmut Haller

8 goals
 Adriano Novellini

5 goals
 Giuseppe Furino

2 goals
 Gianpietro Marchetti
 Luciano Spinosi

1 goal
 Antonello Cuccureddu
 Sandro Salvadore

References 

 
 
 
 l'Unità, years 1971 and 1972.
 La Stampa, years 1971 and 1972.
 
 
 

Juventus F.C. seasons
Italian football championship-winning seasons
Italian football clubs 1971–72 season